Revista Española de Filosofía Medieval ("Spanish Journal of Medieval Philosophy - REFIME") is a scholarly journal publishing studies and research on medieval philosophy and science. Revista is printed and distributed by UCOPress at the University of Cordoba, Spain. The Journal is sponsored by Sociedad de Filosofía Medieval and it has been published since 1993.

The current editors of Revista Española de Filosofía Medieval are Alexander Fidora Riera (ICREA – Autonomous University of Barcelona), Pedro Mantas España (University of Cordoba), and Nicola Polloni (KU Leuven, BE). The editorial team also includes María Cabré Duran (University of Girona) as journal's executive editor, Jack Ford (University College London) as assistant editor, and Ann Giletti (University of Oxford) as section editor.

References

External links 
 Revista Española de Filosofía Medieval 
 Sociedad de Filosofía Medieval

Medieval philosophy
History of philosophy journals